Kolah Boz may refer to:
Kolah Boz-e Gharbi Rural District
Kolah Boz-e Sharqi Rural District